L'amico Fritz is an opera in three acts by Pietro Mascagni, premiered in 1891  from a libretto by P. Suardon (Nicola Daspuro) (with additions by Giovanni Targioni-Tozzetti), based on the French novel L'ami Fritz by Émile Erckmann and Pierre-Alexandre Chatrian.

While the opera enjoyed some success in its day and is probably Mascagni's most famous work after Cavalleria rusticana, today it is performed far more rarely than Cavalleria, which remains Mascagni's only enduringly popular work outside Italy, where L'amico Fritz and Iris are still in the active repertoire. The "Cherry Duet" between Fritz and Suzel in Act 2 is the best known piece in the opera and is often performed separately in concert.

Performance history
The opera was first performed in Rome at the Teatro Costanzi, on 31 October 1891.  Other first performances include those in Hamburg on 16 January 1892 with Gustav Mahler conducting; in London on 23 May 1892 at the Royal Opera House, Covent Garden; and in
Australia on 19 October 1893 at the Princess's Theatre in Melbourne.

Roles

Synopsis
Time: indefinite; sometime in the 19th century
Place: indefinite; probably somewhere in Alsace

Act 1
The dining room of Fritz Kobus’ house

Fritz Kobus, a wealthy landowner is in discussion with his friend David, the local rabbi. Despite his disdain for marriage Fritz agrees to provide the dowry for a young couple. Fritz's friends join him to celebrate his birthday. He is presented with a bouquet by Suzel, the daughter of one of his tenants. She joins the birthday celebration and is moved when the gypsy Beppe enters playing his violin. When Suzel leaves David comments that she will make a good bride and that he will find her a husband. Fritz protests that she is too young. They argue about marriage and Fritz bets David one of his vineyards that he will never marry.

Act 2
The courtyard of a farm

Suzel is preparing to pick cherries as the farmers go out to the fields. Fritz approaches and helps her. They sing of the enchantment of the spring and the flowers. Fritz's friends arrive and Fritz leaves to look over the farms. David stays behind to talk to Suzel. When he suggests that she might be a bride, she becomes embarrassed and leaves. Fritz returns and David mentions that he thinks he has found the right man for Suzel to marry. Fritz becomes visibly upset and, left alone, realizes that he is in love with the girl.

Act 3
The dining room of Fritz Kobus’ house

Fritz cannot banish thoughts of Suzel. Beppe enters and attempts to cheer him up with a song, but Fritz becomes even more depressed. David arrives and tells Fritz that Suzel is engaged to a fine young man and her father will soon ask for Fritz's blessing. Enraged, Fritz says that he will refuse and leaves. Suzel enters sadly but David insists that everything will be all right. He leaves her alone and she voices her despair and love for Fritz. Fritz enters and asks about her engagement. He quickly senses that she does not love her intended. Fritz reveals his feelings for her and the two admit their love. David enters and declares that he has won his wager with Fritz, telling him that he is going to give his winnings, Fritz's vineyard, to Suzel as a wedding present.

Recordings

External links 
 Libretto of L'amico Fritz on operalibretto.com

References

Italian-language operas
Operas
Operas by Pietro Mascagni
1891 operas